The 1920 United States presidential election in Kentucky took place on November 2, 1920, as part of the 1920 United States presidential election. Voters chose thirteen representatives, or electors to the Electoral College, who voted for president and vice president.

Background and vote
Ever since the Civil War, Kentucky had been shaped politically by divisions created by that war between secessionist, Democratic counties and Unionist, Republican ones, although the state as a whole leaned Democratic throughout this era and the GOP had carried the state only once – by a very narrow margin in 1896 when northern parts of the state were affected by hostility towards William Jennings Bryan, and state native John M. Palmer drew votes from the Democrats.

In 1919, however, Kentucky saw a significant change as the Republicans won not merely the governorship via Edwin P. Morrow but also control of the state legislature. However, there was a thought at the time that the triumph was partly a reflection of Morrow's own personal popularity.

The state legislature would ratify the Nineteenth Amendment on January 6, 1920 by more than three-to-one in both houses, and Kentucky would – alongside North Carolina which was abolishing its poll tax – observe the largest mobilization of new voters in the entire Union, and possibly the largest mobilization of female voters anywhere.

Despite the extreme hostility to outgoing President Wilson, Democratic nominee and former Ohio Governor James M. Cox – who originated in Butler County, Ohio just across the state line – was supported powerfully by Fayette County political boss Billy Kair, and alongside the mobilization of female voters noted above, this caused Kentucky to lead the nation in turnout. With this high turnout and Kair's powerful support of Governor Cox, the Democrats were able to carry Kentucky by 0.44 percent or 4,017 votes, in spite of Cox losing Tennessee and all the other Border States to Ohio Senator and Republican nominee Warren G. Harding, who nationally won the largest popular-vote margin on record. Alongside North Carolina, Kentucky was the state which most resisted the Republican landslide, with Cox falling by only 3 percent from Woodrow Wilson’s 1916 vote share.

Results

Results by county

References

Kentucky
1920
1920 Kentucky elections